Janine Magnin-Lamouche (6 August 1920 – 19 November 2022) was a French hurdler. She competed in the women's 80 metres hurdles competition at the 1948 Summer Olympics.

Magnin-Lamouche died on 19 November 2022, at the age of 102.

References

1920 births
2022 deaths
Athletes (track and field) at the 1948 Summer Olympics
Athletes from Paris
French centenarians
French female hurdlers
Olympic athletes of France
Women centenarians